Huggate is a village and civil parish in the East Riding of Yorkshire, England.

According to the 2011 UK census, Huggate parish had a population of 342, an increase on the 2001 UK census figure of 317.

Huggate has one of the deepest wells in England. The village contains the Wolds Inn public house on the Driffield road.

The parish church of St Mary is a Grade I listed building.

The Yorkshire Wolds Way National Trail, a long distance footpath passes to the north of the village. There are walks through the local area.

History
'Huggate' is derived possibly from road to or near the mounds from the Old Norse haugr and gata.

In 1823 Huggate was a civil parish in the Wapentake of Harthill. The parish church was under the patronage of the King; a Methodist chapel also existed. At the end of July each year were held races. Population at the time was 413, with occupations including fourteen farmers, one of whom was also a butcher, a carpenter, two shopkeepers, a tailor, and a shoemaker. The landlord of The Chaise Inn public house was also a blacksmith and gunsmith. The ecclesiastical parish rector and curate, and the vicar of the village of Warter resided in Huggate. A carrier operated between the village and Pocklington once a week.

Huggate Wold airstrip
To the north-west of the village, south of the A166 road is Huggate Wold. In the early 1940s, the site was surveyed for a bomber base, and building nearly went ahead, but a better location was found further west, which became RAF Full Sutton. However, in October 1943, the Royal Air Force created an airstrip from steel mesh at Huggate Wold to test the airstrip in preparation for the forthcoming invasion of Europe, which would require 'pop-up' airfields. Two RAF squadrons, 168 sqn and 170 sqn, both equipped with North American Mustang aircraft under the control of No. 123 Airfield Headquarters, spent a week at the temporary airfield continually landing and taking-off so that the steel mesh airstrip could be assessed. It also gave the pilots and ground crew the experience of using the steel mesh airstrip in a field with no facilities.

References

External links 

Huggate Parish Website
Wold's Villages Website - Huggate

Villages in the East Riding of Yorkshire
Civil parishes in the East Riding of Yorkshire